Francis Charles Kilner (1851–1921) was a British Anglican suffragan bishop in the early part of the 20th century.

Born in 1851, he was educated at Rugby and Keble College, Oxford.

He was ordained after a period of study at Ripon College Cuddesdon in 1874. He began his career with a curacy at Christ Church, Bootle, after which he was Missioner for the  Diocese of Winchester, and then  Vicar of Bingley. Following this he was Archdeacon of Craven and then Suffragan Bishop of Richmond until his death on 19 March 1921.

References

1851 births
People educated at Rugby School
Alumni of Keble College, Oxford
Alumni of Ripon College Cuddesdon
Archdeacons of Craven
1921 deaths
20th-century Church of England bishops
Anglican bishops of Richmond